Delpy is a surname. Notable people with the surname include:

Albert Delpy (born 1941), French actor and writer
David Delpy (born 1948), British bioengineer
Hippolyte Camille Delpy (1842–1910), French painter
Julie Delpy (born 1969), French-American actress, director, screenwriter, and singer-songwriter